Daughter of the Moon Goddess is a 2022 adult fantasy novel by Malaysian writer Sue Lynn Tan. Tan's debut novel was inspired by Chinese mythology and the legend of the moon goddess Chang'e. Published on 11 January 2022 by Harper Voyager, an imprint of HarperCollins, it is the first book in a planned duology. It follows Xingyin as she embark on a journey to free her mother from the ruthless Celestial Emperor.

Plot
Xingyin is an immortal and has lived in Isolation with her mother. Her existence has been kept secret for years from the other's in the Celestial Kingdom unaware of her mother's history.

Her mother Chang'e became the moon goddess when she drank her husband's elixir and she lost her husband and was granted immortality but the Celestials — 'gods' became angry and imprisoned her in the Palace where she hides her secret daughter, Xingyin. 
Soon when her existence is discovered by the Celestial Emperor, she flees from her only home to the Celestial Kingdom and swears to free her mother from imprisonment.

Xingyin discovers she has magic and her skills for archery which she inherited from her father and works hard to get enough status to bargain her mother's freedom. She befriends the Crown Prince Liwei, the Captain of the Celestial Army and she learns more about magic while disguising herself as an archer.
Xingyin works undercover to free her mother, while others plot against the Kingdom but the Emperors are also staging a malicious plan.

Reception
The book was ranked as one of the most anticipated books of 2022 by several magazines and literary websites including   Polygon  , PopSugar,  Book riot and Tor.com. It received several positive receptions from reviewers, and starred trade reviews from Publishers’ Weekly, Library Journal and BookPage. In a starred review, Publishers Weekly noted that "Tan paints a lush, sparkling world in her inventive reimagining of the age-old Chinese folktale. The result is a riveting page-turner that will leave fantasy lovers satisfied and eager for more". Library Journal calls the book “an exquisitely detailed fantasy with a strong, vulnerable protagonist. The intimate prose makes Tan’s wonderful debut an immersive experience…”. A review from Kirkus Review called the novel "A standard court fantasy, unique in its expansion on the story of the Mid-Autumn Festival". The BookPage starred review comments: “Filled with intricate world building, heartbreaking romance and mind-bending intrigue. Tan’s story is mythic in its scope yet personal in its execution…The result is an all-consuming work of literary fantasy that is breathtaking both for its beauty and its suspense.”

References 

2022 fantasy novels
2022 debut novels
Young adult novels
Young adult fantasy novels
Novels set in China
Malaysian novels